Caconemobius schauinslandi is a species of cricket known by the common name Schauinsland's bush cricket. It is native to Hawaii.

References

Insects of Hawaii
Ground crickets
Taxonomy articles created by Polbot
Insects described in 1901